Tuqma (Quechua for canine tooth, also spelled Tujma) is a mountain in the Bolivian Andes which reaches a height of approximately . It is located in the Cochabamba Department, Mizque Province, Mizque Municipality, near the border to the Carrasco Province, Pocona Municipality. Tuqma lies south of Misk'i. The Wanaku Mayu ("guanaco river") flows along its northern slope.

References 

Mountains of Cochabamba Department